John Smith was an English professional footballer who made over 230 appearances in the Southern and Football Leagues for Reading as a right back. He captained the club and later served as manager.

Honours 
Reading
Southern League Second Division: 1910–11

Individual

Reading Hall of Fame

References

English Football League players
Reading F.C. players
Association football fullbacks

Scottish Football League players
1885 births
Year of death missing
English footballers
People from Fulwood, Lancashire
Blackburn Rovers F.C. players
Southern Football League players
Portsmouth F.C. players
Reading F.C. managers
English Football League managers